James Gow Black (10 May 1835 – 25 December 1914) was a New Zealand chemist, mineralogist, lecturer and university professor . He was born in Tomgarrow, Perthshire, Scotland on 10 May 1835, the eldest of seven children of David, quarrier and farmer, and Margaret (née Gow).

Fenby noted that “Black supported himself by manual labour, and from the age of 14 by teaching. The nearest parish school was six miles from his home, so he set up his own school to teach neighbouring children”. After teaching at Liff Free Church School he attended Moray House Training College and then the University of Edinburgh, from where Black graduated MA in 1864, BSc in 1867 and DSc in 1869.

In 1871 there were 23 applicants for the chair of natural science at the newly established University of Otago, New Zealand. The position was awarded to Black by unanimous vote. The family sailed on the Christian McCausland from Glasgow to Port Chalmers, the main port of Dunedin, arriving after a 90 day voyage on 28 December 1871.

In his introductory lecture at the University Black claimed that on of the aims of a scientific education was to enable a person ”to produce a pound of corn, or wool, or iron, or gold, at half the expenditure which it previously cost”. It was this profoundly practical approach to science that was his guiding philosophy. The two books he published were for use in the field; he was not a researcher.

A colleague added:

Books

Family
James Gow Black married Jeannie Crichton on 25 August 1869 in Edinburgh. They had four children:
David Hugh Tibbett
Jessie Elizabeth
Margaret
Janie Alice
The first child was born in Scotland, and the rest in New Zealand.

James died on Christmas Day 1914 in Halfmoon Bay. He is buried there, with his daughter Margaret and her husband. Jeannie died in Otago, aged 82, on 30 April 1919.

References

1835 births
1914 deaths
New Zealand educators
New Zealand chemists
New Zealand mineralogists
Scottish emigrants to New Zealand
Academic staff of the University of Otago